The Dogon languages are a small closely-related language family that is spoken by the Dogon people of Mali and may belong to the proposed Niger–Congo family. There are about 600,000 speakers of its dozen languages. They are tonal languages, and most, like Dogul, have two tones, but some, like Donno So, have three. Their basic word order is subject–object–verb.

External relationships
The evidence linking Dogon to the Niger–Congo family is weak, and their place within the family, assuming they do belong, is not clear. Various theories have been proposed, placing them in Gur, Mande, or as an independent branch, the last now being the preferred approach. The Dogon languages show no remnants of the noun class system characteristic of much of Niger–Congo, leading linguists to conclude that they likely diverged from Niger–Congo very early.

Roger Blench comments,

and:

The Bamana and Fula languages have exerted significant influence on Dogon, due to their close cultural and geographical ties.

Blench (2015) suggests that Bangime and Dogon languages may have a substratum from a "missing" branch of Nilo-Saharan that had split off relatively early from Proto-Nilo-Saharan, and tentatively calls that branch "Plateau".

Internal classification
The Dogon consider themselves a single ethnic group, but recognise that their languages are different. In Dogon cosmology, Dogon constitutes six of the twelve languages of the world (the others being Fulfulde, Mooré, Bambara, Bozo and Tamasheq). Jamsay is thought to be the original Dogon language, but the Dogon "recognise a myriad of tiny distinctions even between parts of villages and sometimes individuals, and strive to preserve these" (Hochstetler 2004:18).

The best-studied Dogon language is the escarpment language Toro So (Tɔrɔ sɔɔ) of Sanga, due to Marcel Griaule's studies there and because Toro So was selected as one of thirteen national languages of Mali. It is mutually intelligible with other escarpment varieties. However, the plains languages—Tene Ka, Tomo Ka, and Jamsay, which are not intelligible with Toro so—have more speakers, and Jamsay and Tommo so are most conservative linguistically.

Calame-Griaule (1956)
Calame-Griaule appears to have been the first to work out the various varieties of Dogon. Calame-Griaule (1956) classified the languages as follows, with accommodation given for languages which have since been discovered (new Dogon languages were reported as late as 2005), or have since been shown to be mutually intelligible (as Hochstetler confirmed for the escarpment dialects). The two standard languages are asterisked.

Plains Dogon: Jamsai,* Tɔrɔ tegu, Western Plains (dialects: Togo kã, Tengu kã, Tomo kã)
Escarpment Dogon (dialects: Tɔrɔ sɔɔ,* Tɔmmɔ sɔɔ, Donno sɔ  Kamma sɔ)
West Dogon: Duleri, Mombo, Ampari–Penange; Budu
North Plateau Dogon: Bondum, Dogul
Yanda
Nanga: Naŋa, Bankan Tey (Walo), Ben Tey
Tebul

Douyon and Blench (2005) report an additional variety, which is as yet unclassified:
Ana Tiŋa.

Blench noted that the plural suffix on nouns suggests that Budu is closest to Mombo, so it has been tentatively included as West Dogon above. He also notes that Walo–Kumbe is lexically similar to Naŋa; Hochstetler suspects it may be Naŋa. The similarities between these languages may be shared with Yanda. These are all extremely poorly known.

Glottolog 4.3
Glottolog 4.3 synthesises classifications from Moran & Prokić (2013) and Hochstetler (2004). Moran & Prokić (2013) argue for a binary east-west split within Dogon, with Yanda Dom Dogon, Tebul Ure Dogon, and Najamba-Kindige as originally western Dogon languages that have become increasingly more similar to eastern Dogon languages due to intensive contact.

Western division
West Dogon
Ampari Dogon
Bunoge Dogon
Mombo Dogon
Penange Dogon
Tiranige Diga Dogon
North Plateau Dogon
Dogul Dom Dogon
Yanda-Bondum-Tebul
Najamba-Kindige: Bondum Dom, Kindige, Najamba
Tebul Ure Dogon
Yanda-Ana
Ana Tinga Dogon
Yanda Dom Dogon
Eastern division
Escarpment Dogon
Donno So Dogon
Tommo So Dogon
Toro So Dogon: Ibi So, Ireli, Sangha So, Yorno So, Youga So
Nangan Dogon
Bankan Tey Dogon
Ben Tey Dogon
Nanga Dogon
Plains Dogon
Jamsay Dogon: Bama, Domno, Gono, Guru, Perge Tegu
Toro Tegu Dogon
Western Plains Dogon
Tengou-Togo Dogon: Gimri Kan, Tengu Kan, Tenu Kan, Togo Kan, Woru Kan
Tomo Kan Dogon

Pre-Dogon language
Bangime language ( Baŋgɛri mɛ), formerly considered a divergent branch of Dogon, turns out not to be Dogon at all, and is possibly a language isolate (Blench 2005b). Blench believes that it is a remnant of the pre-Dogon languages of the area; the Dogon appear to have been in the area for many thousands of years.

Additionally, Blench (2015) suggests that there is a Nilo-Saharan substratum in the Dogon languages, with the Nilo-Saharan substrate being a currently extinct branch of Nilo-Saharan that Blench tentatively refers to as "Plateau."

Comparative vocabulary
Comparison of basic vocabulary words of the Dogon languages, along with Bangime:

Numerals
Comparison of numerals in individual languages:

See also
Languages of Mali
Dogon word lists (Wiktionary)

Notes

References
 Bendor-Samuel, John & Olsen, Elizabeth J. & White, Ann R. (1989) 'Dogon', in Bendor-Samuel & Rhonda L. Hartell (eds.) The Niger–Congo languages: A classification and description of Africa's largest language family (pp. 169–177). Lanham, Maryland: University Press of America.
 Bertho, J. (1953) 'La place des dialectes dogon de la falaise de Bandiagara parmi les autres groupes linguistiques de la zone soudanaise,' Bulletin de l'IFAN, 15, 405–441.
 .
 Blench, Roger (2005b) 'Baŋgi me, a language of unknown affiliation in Northern Mali', OGMIOS: Newsletter of Foundation for Endangered Languages, 3.02 (#26), 15-16. (report with wordlist)
 Calame-Griaule, Geneviève (1956) Les dialectes Dogon. Africa, 26 (1), 62-72.
 Calame-Griaule, Geneviève (1968) Dictionnaire Dogon Dialecte tɔrɔ: Langue et Civilisation. Paris: Klincksieck: Paris.
 Heath, Jeffrey (2008) A grammar of Jamsay. Berlin/New York: Mouton de Gruyter.
 
 
 Plungian, Vladimir Aleksandrovič (1995) Dogon (Languages of the world materials vol. 64). München: LINCOM Europa
 Williamson, Kay & Blench, Roger (2000) 'Niger–Congo', in Heine, Bernd and Nurse, Derek (eds) African Languages – An Introduction. Cambridge: Cambridge University press, pp. 11–42.

External links

 Dogon and Bangime Linguistics
 Dogon linguistics website
 Dogon languages on Rogerblench.info (includes linguistic data and pictures)
 Dogon Languages and Linguistics An (sic) Comprehensive Annotated Bibliography Abbie Hantgan (2007)

 
Languages of Burkina Faso
Languages of Mali
Subject–object–verb languages
Language families